Serbia competed at the 2018 Winter Olympics in Pyeongchang, South Korea, from 9 to 25 February 2018, with four competitors in two sports.

Competitors
The following is the list of number of competitors participating in the Serbian delegation per sport.

Alpine skiing 

Serbia qualified three athletes, two male and one female.

Cross-country skiing 

Serbia qualified one male athlete.

Distance

Sprint

See also
Serbia at the 2018 Summer Youth Olympics

References

Nations at the 2018 Winter Olympics
2018
2018 in Serbian sport